The 1915 Louisiana Industrial football team was an American football team that represented the Louisiana Industrial Institute—now known as Louisiana Tech University—as a member of the Louisiana Intercollegiate Athletic Association (LIAA) during the 1915 college football season. Led by seventh-year head coach Percy S. Prince, Louisiana Industrial compiled an overall record of 3–1–2.

Schedule

References

Louisiana Industrial
Louisiana Tech Bulldogs football seasons
Louisiana Industrial football